Gary Arlee Paur (born November 3, 1947) is an American politician. He has served as a Republican member for the 19th district in the North Dakota House of Representatives since 2011.

References

1947 births
Living people
People from Grand Forks County, North Dakota
Farmers from North Dakota
Republican Party members of the North Dakota House of Representatives
21st-century American politicians